William David Murray, 5th Earl of Mansfield, 4th Earl of Mansfield, PC (20 July 1860 – 29 April 1906) was a British peer.

The son of William David Murray, Viscount Stormont, Mansfield succeeded to the family earldoms on the death of his grandfather, William Murray, 4th Earl of Mansfield, in 1898.

He served in the Grenadier Guards, retiring in 1894 with the rank of captain. He chaired several parliamentary committees. A friend of King Edward VII, he was sworn of the Privy Council in 1905. He died unmarried in 1906 and was succeeded by his brother Alan.

References 

 https://www.ukwhoswho.com/view/10.1093/ww/9780199540891.001.0001/ww-9780199540884-e-188653

1860 births
1906 deaths
Members of the Privy Council of the United Kingdom
Grenadier Guards officers
Earls in the Peerage of Great Britain